Alkalihalobacillus rhizosphaerae is a Gram-positive, diazotrophic and rod-shaped bacterium from the genus of Alkalihalobacillus which has been isolated from rhizospheric soil.

References

Bacillaceae
Bacteria described in 2013